David Harris (born 19 November 1953) is an English former football defender who had a six-year professional career in the English Football League with Port Vale from 1973 to 1979. He was voted the club's Player of the Year in 1974 and 1977. He then spent two seasons with Halifax Town, before entering the non-league scene with Stafford Rangers.

Career

Port Vale
Born in Stoke-on-Trent, his father was Wilf Harris, who had a trial with Stoke City in his youth. A tall defender, rose through the ranks of Port Vale juniors after being signed from junior team Abbey Hulton United. He signed his first professional contract in July 1973, with Vale then in the Third Division. He went on to make his debut in a 3–1 win over Rochdale on 3 November 1973 after Bill Summerscales was suspended and Roy Cross injured. Over the course of the 1973–74 season he scored five goals in 36 games, and picked up the club's Player of the Year award. His first senior goal came in a 2–1 win against Scarborough in the FA Cup on 15 December. He also scored goals against Luton Town, Tranmere Rovers, Bournemouth, and Brighton & Hove Albion.

He then fell out of favour, though he was once again a first team regular by March 1975. He posted 22 appearances in 1974–75, scoring one goal against Swindon Town. He played 37 games in 1975–76, finding the net against Grimsby Town and Southend United. He made 48 appearances in 1976–77, forming solid centre-back partnerships with first John Ridley and then Garry Dulson, and became the first player to win the club's Player of the Year award for a second time.

Harris refused a contract at the start of the 1977–78 campaign, he returned to Vale Park to play a further 45 games, scoring against Plymouth Argyle and Oxford United, as Vale were relegated. He again he fell out of favour during the "Valiants" 1978–79 Fourth Division campaign, and made just thirteen appearances. This time he did not regain his place, and instead was transferred to Halifax Town in May 1979.

Halifax Town and Stafford Rangers
The "Shaymen" struggled in the bottom half of the Fourth Division in 1979–80 and 1980–81, and had to apply for re-election in 1981, having finished second-from-bottom of the English Football League. Following this, Harris moved on to Stafford Rangers, who were then in the Alliance Premier League.

Career statistics
Source:

References

1953 births
Living people
Footballers from Stoke-on-Trent
English footballers
Association football defenders
Port Vale F.C. players
Halifax Town A.F.C. players
Stafford Rangers F.C. players
English Football League players
National League (English football) players